Eduardo Reyes may refer to:
Captain Eduardo "Ed" Reyes, pilot who landed Philippine Airlines Flight 434 after attempted terrorism
Eduardo Najarro Reyes, Rector of San Carlos and San Ambrosio Seminary
Ed Reyes, Los Angeles City council member
Eduardo Rodríguez (right-handed pitcher), middle relief pitcher